Thomas Freienstein (born 9 March 1960) is a German former cyclist. He won the Hessen-Rundfahrt in 1982 and 1984. He competed in the individual road race and the team time trial events at the 1984 Summer Olympics.

References

External links
 

1960 births
Living people
German male cyclists
Olympic cyclists of West Germany
Cyclists at the 1984 Summer Olympics
People from Fulda
Sportspeople from Kassel (region)
Cyclists from Hesse